Bangladesh is a country with thousands of rivers and ponds and is notable for being a fish-loving nation, acquiring the name "Machh-e Bhat-e Bangali" (which means, Bengali by fish and rice).

Ilish is the national fish of the country where it contributes 13% of country's total fish production. Fish are caught both from natural resources and by farming in self-made ponds.

Fishes of Bangladesh

References

External links 
 Freshwater and Estuarine Fishes of Bangladesh - Bangladesh Fisheries Information Share Home (BdFISH)
 Fish's of Bangladesh
 Sea Fish BD

Bangladesh
 
 
Fishes